The following is a timeline of the history of the city of Seattle, Washington, USA.

Before the 19th century
 Native Americans explore and settle throughout the Puget Sound region which includes the Seattle area.

19th century

 1851 – 
 September 14: The Collins Party led by Luther Collins finds a settlement in present-day Georgetown.
 November 13: Two months after the founding of present-day Georgetown, the Denny Party settles at Alki Point to spend a rainy winter.
 1852 – The Denny Party finds it difficult to settle at Alki Point then moves to present day downtown Seattle in April.
 1853 – Seattle becomes seat of King County, Washington Territory.
 1854 – School opens.
 1855 – Population: 300.
 1858 – The arrival of Manuel Lopes, the city's first Black Resident. 
 1861 – Washington Territorial University established.
 1863 – Washington Gazette newspaper begins publication.
 1864 – May 16: The Mercer Girls arrive.
 1867 – Weekly Intelligencer newspaper begins publication.
 1868 – The Seattle Library Association is founded.
 1869 – Henry A. Atkins becomes mayor.
 1870
 Central School opens.
 Church of Our Lady of Good Help founded.
 Population: 1,107.
 1873 – Seattle & Walla Walla Railroad organized.
 1874 – Gas street lamps installed.
 1875
 San Francisco–Seattle steamship service begins.
 Ms. Maynard's Reading Room opens.
 1878 – Seattle Daily Post begins publication.
 1879 – Squire opera house built.
 1880
 City chartered.
 Frye opera house built.
 Population: 3,533.
 1883 – Telephone and Columbia and Puget Sound Railroad begin operating.
 1885 – Seattle, Lake Shore and Eastern Railway organized.
 1886 – February: Most Chinese were expelled by White mobs. 
 1888 – Rainier Club established.
 1889
 Seattle Federation of Women's Clubs organized.
 June 6: Great Seattle Fire.
 Seattle Fire Department established.
 Electric streetcar begins operating.
 City becomes part of the new U.S. State of Washington.
 1890
 Telegraph newspaper begins publication.
 Country Club established.
 Population: 42,837.
 1891 – Seattle Public Library opens.
 1892 – Pioneer Building constructed.
 1893
 Great Northern Railway begins operating.
 Seattle Athletic Club organized.
 Seattle Theatre opens.
 Curtis & Guptil photographers in business.
 1894 – The Argus newspaper begins publication.
The Seattle Republican daily newspaper beings publication
 1895 - Seattle General Hospital established.
 1898 – U.S. assay office opens.
 1899
 The Seattle Star newspaper begins publication.
 Tlingit totem pole installed in Pioneer Place.
 1900
 Population: 80,671.
 Seattle General Hospital re-opened in a new building.

20th century

1900s–1940s

 1901 – Renton Hill Community Improvement Club organized.
 1903
 July 30: Semi-centennial of founding of Seattle.
 City hires Olmsted Brothers to design public parks.
 1905
 South Seattle becomes part of city.
 Seattle Fine Arts Society established.
 1906
 The Mountaineers (club) formed.
 Public Library building opens.
 King Street Station opens.
 1907
 City expands, annexing Atlantic City, Ballard, Columbia, Dunlap, Rainier Beach, Ravenna, South-East Seattle, South Park, and West Seattle.
 Pike Place Market opens.
 St. James Cathedral built.
 1908 
 The Great White Fleet visits Seattle and Puget Sound area. 
 1909
 June 1: Alaska–Yukon–Pacific Exposition opens.
 Chicago, Milwaukee & St. Paul Railroad begins operating.
 1910
 Georgetown becomes part of city.
 Municipal League of Seattle founded.
 Population: 237,194.
 1911 – Port of Seattle established.
 1913
 National Association for the Advancement of Colored People branch established.
 20th Avenue NE Bridge opens.
 1914 – Smith Tower built.
 1916
 Seattle Audubon Society established.
 Coliseum Theater opens. 
 1918 – Bessaroth Synagogue dedicated.
 1919 – February: Seattle General Strike.
 1920 – Seattle Northwest Enterprise newspaper begins publication.
 1922 – The first Miss Seattle is crowned. 
 1923
 Seattle Goodwill Industries established.
 Mountaineers Players (theatre troupe) active.
 1924
 September 28: First aerial circumnavigation of the world lands at Sand Point.
 Seattle Camera Club founded.
 1925
 Sears, Roebuck store in business.
 Eagles Auditorium Building constructed.
 Seattle Planning Commission established.
 1926 – U.S. Naval Air Station established at Sand Point.
 1928 – Civic Auditorium and Paramount Theatre open.
 1929 – Seattle Urban League founded.
 1930
 Pike Place Fish Market and Japanese American Citizen's League established.
 Exchange Building constructed.
 1932 – Grace Hospital established.
 1933 – Seattle Art Museum opens.
 1938 – Vedanta Society of Western Washington founded.
 1940 – Population: 368,302.
 April 28: Seattle trolleybus system opens.
 1941
 April 12:  Last streetcar line closed.
 1946 – Seattle Foundation established.
 1947
 Airport begins operating.
 Memorial Stadium opens.
 1949 – Free port opens.

1950s–1990s

 1950
 Seattle Chinese Golf Club formed.
 Population: 467,591.
 1957 – Sister city relationship established with Kobe, Japan.
 1959 – City joins Puget Sound Governmental Conference.
 1960 – Population: 557,087.
 1961
 Space Needle erected.
 American Institute of Architects Seattle chapter active.
 1962
 Alweg Monorail begins operating.
 April 21 – Seattle World's Fair opens.
 Congress of Racial Equality chapter established.
 Blaine Memorial United Methodist Church built.
 1963
 Seattle Opera and Seattle Repertory Theatre founded.
 Martin Cinerama opens.
 1964 
 August 21: The Beatles perform at the Seattle Center Coliseum.
 1965
 April 29: The 6.7  Puget Sound earthquake affected western Washington with a maximum Mercalli intensity of VIII (Severe), causing seven deaths and $12.5–28 million in financial losses in the Puget Sound region.
 ACT Theatre founded.
 1966
 August 25: More than two years later, The Beatles perform for the last time at the Seattle Center Coliseum.
 1967
 November: Radical Women founded.Seattle Radical Women, one of first women's liberation groups in the United States, forms in November 1967.
 Allied Arts of Seattle founded.
 Sister city relationship established with Bergen, Norway.
 1969
 Little Bread Co. and Brasserie Pittsbourg in business.
 Seafirst Building constructed.
 1970 – Seattle Marathon, and negative income tax program begin.
 1971
 Mayor's Arts Festival begins (later known as Bumbershoot).
 Starbucks in business.
 1972
 Pacific Northwest Dance Association established.
 Intiman Theatre Festival begins.
 1973 – Sister city relationship established with Tashkent, Uzbekistan.
 1974 – Seattle Seahawks franchise established, would begin play in 1976.
 1975 – World's first "commercial software for personal computers" invented in Seattle.
 1976 – Daybreak Star Cultural Center opens.
 1977
 Seattle Mariners baseball team formed.
 Sister city relationship established with Beersheba, Israel.
 1978 – Central Co-op established.
 1979
 P-Patch Advisory Council established.
 Music Magazine The Rocket begins publishing.
 June 1: Seattle SuperSonics basketball team wins NBA Finals.
 Sister city relationship established with Mazatlán, Mexico.
 1980
 Subterranean Pop fanzine begins publication.
 Sister city relationship established with Nantes, France.
 The last Chicago, Milwaukee, St. Paul and Pacific Railroad train leaves Seattle before abandonment.
 1981 – Sister city relationships established with Christchurch, New Zealand; and Mombasa, Kenya.
 1982 – Market Park landscaped.
 1983 – Sister city relationship established with Chongqing, China.
 1984
 911 Media Arts Center and Weird Science Salon founded.
 Sister city relationship established with Limbe, Cameroon.
 1985
 Seattle Municipal Archives established.
 Following a 3-year construction period, the newly constructed 76 storey Columbia Center in downtown is complete. Therefore, becoming the tallest building in the city which forces CAP (Citizen Alternative Plan) to call in height limits.
 1986 – Sister city relationships established with Galway, Ireland; and Reykjavík, Iceland.
 1988 
 Washington State Convention Center and Telephone Museum open.
 Nirvana releases its first album on Seattle's SubPop Records.
 1989
 Jim McDermott becomes U.S. representative for Washington's 7th congressional district.
 Sister city relationship established with Daejeon, South Korea.
 1990
 September 15: Downtown Seattle Transit Tunnel opens.
 Norm Rice becomes mayor.
 October: Pearl Jam plays its first concert ever in Seattle's Off Ramp Café. 
 Population: 516,259.
 1991
 Sustainable Seattle nonprofit established.
 Washington Hemp Expo begins.
 Seattle Art Museum rebuilt.
 Sister city relationships established with Cebu, Philippines; and Kaohsiung, Taiwan.
 1992 – Sister city relationship established with Pécs, Hungary; and Surabaya, Indonesia.
 1993
 Seattle Knights jousting acting troupe founded.
 Fictional movie Sleepless in Seattle released.
 Sister city relationships established with Gdynia, Poland; and Perugia, Italy.
 1994
 Amazon.com in business.
 Seattle Asian Art Museum opens.
 City Public Access Network online.
 1996 – Sister city relationship established with Haiphong, Vietnam.
 1997
 Seattle Internet Exchange and Seattle Channel established.
 Jet City Maven newspaper begins publication.
 1998 – Paul Schell becomes mayor.
 1999
 November 30: Anti-globalization protest during World Trade Organization Ministerial Conference.
 Town Hall Seattle opens.
 Sister city relationship established with Sihanoukville, Cambodia.
 2000
 Experience Music Project opens.
 Music Magazine The Rocket ends publishing.

21st century

 2001
 February 27: Seattle Mardi Gras Riots
 February 28: Nisqually earthquake.
 September: Boeing relocates its corporate headquarters to Chicago, Illinois.
 2002
 July 28: The first sporting event at Seahawks Stadium, a Seattle Sounders soccer match, is held.
 2004
 Seattle Central Library building opens.
 Seattle Civil Rights and Labor History Project founded.
 Rat City Rollergirls (rollerderby league) founded.
 2006
 Seattle Metropolitan begins publication.
 Kavana Cooperative founded.
 2007
 December 12: South Lake Union Streetcar line opened.
 2008 
 Tilted Thunder Rail Birds (rollerderby league) formed.
 Seattle SuperSonics move to Oklahoma City
 2009
 July 18: Central Link light rail begins service between Westlake and Tukwila.
 December 19: Central Link is extended to SeaTac Airport.
 InvestigateWest news headquartered in Seattle.
 Upping Technology for Underserved Neighbors and Jigsaw Renaissance founded.
 CondoInternet in business.
 2010
 Northwest Chocolate Festival begins.
 Michael McGinn becomes mayor.
 Population: 608,660; metro 3,439,809.
 2011
 Seattle Shorts Film Fest begins.
 Citizen University headquartered in city.
 2012
 Ban against plastic shopping bags in effect.
 Chihuly Garden and Glass and Living Computer Museum open.
 2013
 Construction of the Alaskan Way Viaduct replacement tunnel by the tunnel-boring machine Bertha begins.
 Population: 652,405.
 2014
 January: Ed Murray becomes mayor.
 February: Seattle Seahawks win Super Bowl football contest.
 May: City minimum wage hike announced.
 2015
 May: A large kayak protest against Arctic oil drilling is held on Elliott Bay in response to a Shell oil platform arriving at the Port of Seattle.
 September: School teacher labor strike.
 2016
 January 23: First Hill Streetcar line opens.
 March 19: University Link Tunnel extends light rail to Capitol Hill and Husky Stadium.
 2020
 Beginning in March: During the week, in response to the COVID-19 pandemic in the United States across Washington (state), 3 counties in Seattle area issued directives for residents to shelter-in-place until at least April 7.
 Beginning in May: George Floyd protests in Seattle begins.
 2023
 February 21: Seattle became the first city in the United States to ban discrimination based on caste.

See also
 History of Seattle
 Neighborhoods in Seattle
 List of mayors of Seattle
 Timelines of Seattle's sister cities: Bergen, Kobe, Mombasa, Nantes, Perugia, Reykjavík, Tashkent
 Timeline of Spokane, Washington
 Timeline of the Tri-Cities, Washington
 Timeline of Washington (state) history

References

Bibliography

Published in the 19th century

Published in the 20th century
 
 
 
 
 
 
 
  v.2
 
 Cornelius Hanford, Seattle and Enzirons, 1852–1924 (Seattle, 1924)
 
 
 Roger Sale, Seattle: Past to Present (Seattle, 1976)
 
 
 Richard C. Berner, Seattle in the 20th Century (Seattle: Charles Press, 1991)
 
 
 Bob Lane, Better Than Promised, An Informal History of the Municipality of Metropolitan Seattle (Seattle: King County Department of Metropolitan Services, 1995)

Published in the 21st century

External links

 
 
 Materials related to Seattle, various dates (via Library of Congress, Prints & Photos Division)
 Items related to Seattle, various dates (via Digital Public Library of America)
 Items related to Seattle, various dates (via Europeana)
 Various Seattle-related archived websites: 
 
 
 , ca.1914–1949

Images

 
Seattle
Timeline
Years in Washington (state)